The following page lists the power stations in Brazil.

Coal

Gas and oil fired

Gas Turbines

Internal combustion engines

Nuclear

Hydroelectric

Solar

Wind

See also 

Electricity sector in Brazil
Energy policy of Brazil
List of power stations in South America
List of largest power stations in the world
Pumped-storage hydroelectricity

References

Brazil
 
Power stations